Bhanwar Singh Samaur (born 15 August 1943) (डॉ. भंवरसिंह सामौर) is an Indian writer, poet, historian, and social worker from Rajasthan. Samaur is the recipient of the Sahitya Akademi Award 2020 (in Rajasthani language) for his work Sanskriti ri Sanatana Deeth. His career has spanned more than 50 years including works on history, literature, and poetry in Rajasthani as well as Hindi. Dr. Samaur is a retired Hindi Lecturer from Lohia Postgraduate College, Churu.

Samaur is considered an expert on Marwari (Rajasthani) language. His ongoing work is Rajasthani (Marwari)-English-Hindi Dictionary.

In February 2020, he was awarded the Kavi Shri Kag Bapu Lok Sahitya Award.

Early life and education
Samaur was born on 15 August 1943 in Bobasar village in Churu, Rajasthan. His father was Ujeen Dan and grandfather was Chaturdan Samaur.

Samaur completed his Master of Arts in Hindi Literature (MA Hindi) from Rajasthan University.

Career 
Samaur taught as Lecturer in Hindi at Lohia Postgraduate College in Churu, Rajasthan. He also served as the Vice-Principal of Government Girls College, Ratangarh.

Samaur's Yugantarakari Sanyasi (युगान्तरकारी सन्यासी) book was released by the Prime Minister of Mauritius Anerood Jugnauth in Mauritius.

Samaur is also a pioneer in social service, through Lokbharti Bhawan in Bobasar, started the library movement, social service camps so that no one should sleep hungry. The latter program was later accepted by the state government and expanded in Rajasthan. Samaur also helped in the establishment of libraries in around 50 villages of Gujarat.

Bhanwar Singh also chaired sessions during the Sahitya Akademi seminar in 2006.

Rajasthan Sabadkosh Linguist Committee 
Samaur is a member of Linguistic Experts Committee formed for the development of Rajasthani Sabadkosh Project, which aims to digitalise & expand the works Padma Shri Dr. Sitaram Lalas on Rajasthani language.

Published works 

 Samaura, Bhamvara Simha (1 January 1993). Yugantarakari Sannyasi (in Hindi). Prabhat Prakashan. . (Devidan Ratnu)
 Sāmaura, Bhaṃvara Siṃha (1999). Rājasthānī śaktti kāvya (in Hindi). Sāhitya Akādemī. . (राजस्थानी शक्ति काव्य)
 Sāmaura, Bhaṃvara Siṃha (2020). Āūvā kā dharanā (in Hindi). Rājasthānī Granthāgāra. . (आऊवा का धरना)
 Sāmaura, Bhaṃvara Siṃha (1995). Śaṅkaradāna Sāmaura (in Hindi). Sāhitya Akādemī. . (शंकरदान सामौर)
 Samskrti ri sanatana ditha: nibandha sangraha. Vikasa Prakasana. 2020. . (संस्कृति री सनातन दीठ)
 Sāmaura, Bhaṃvara Siṃha (2009). Hamāre sāhitya nirmātā, Rāvata Sārasvata (in Hindi). Ekatā Prakāśana.
 Sāmaura, Bhaṃvara Siṃha (2002). Cūrū Maṇḍala ke yaśasvī cāraṇa (in Hindi). Loka Bhāratī Bhavana. (चूरू मंडल के यशस्वी चारण)
 Sāmaura, Bhaṃvara Siṃha (2001). Śekhāvāṭī ke yaśasvī cāraṇa (in Hindi). Loka Bhāratī Bhavana. (शेखावाटी के यशस्वी चारण)
 Cāraṇa baḍī amolaka cīja (in Hindi). Cāraṇa Sāhitya Śodha Saṃsthāna. 1989.
 Jīvana Kaviyā, Bhaṃvara Siṃha Sāmaura (1996). Maraṇa-tyūṃhāra (in Hindi). Rājasthānī Sāhitya Saṃsthāna. (मरण त्योहार)
 Sāmora, Bhaṃvarasiṃha (1987). Loka pūjya deviyām̐ (in Hindi). Cāraṇa Sāhitya Śodha Saṃsthāna. (लोक पुज्य देवियाँ)
 Prachin Rajasthani Kavya Sangrah (प्राचीन राजस्थानी काव्य संग्रह)
 Lok Niti Kavya (लोक नीति काव्य)

Awards 

 Sahitya Akademi Award 2020 (Rajasthani language)
 Kavi Shri Kag Bapu Lok Sahitya Award (कवि श्रीकाग बापू लोक साहित्य पुरस्कार)
 Rajasthani Culture Award from Rajasthani Language Literature Culture Academy Bikaner 2013 (राजस्थानी भाषा एवं संस्कृति अकादमी बीकानेर से भाषा सेवा सम्मान अंक संस्कृति सम्मान 2013)
 Cultural Award from Rajasthan Cultural Council (राजस्थान सांस्कृतिक परिषद से संस्कृति सम्मान)
 Kaviraj Sanvaldan Ashiya Award from Karni Seva Mandal (करणी सेवा मण्डल से कविराज सांवलदान आशिया पुरस्कार)
 Marudhara ra Moti Award (मरुधर रा मोती सम्मान)
 Gold Medal by Hindi Sahitya Sansad (हिन्दी साहित्य संसद से स्वर्ण पदक)
 Pandit Bharat Vyas Award by (पंडित भरत व्यास पुरस्कार)
 Samprati Sansthan Award (सम्प्रति संस्थान पुरस्कार)
 Kanhaiyalal Sethia Mayad Bhasha Seva Samman (कन्हैयालाल सेठिया मायड़ भाषा सेवा सम्मान)
 Surajmal Mohta Literary Award (सूरजमल मोहता साहित्य पुरस्कार)

Bibliography

References 

Rajasthani folklore
Churu people
Marwari people
Sahitya Akademi Award-winning works
Charan
20th-century Indian poets
Rajasthani culture
1943 births
Living people
21st-century Indian poets
20th-century Indian writers